Kevin "Kevtris" Horton is an American electrical engineer known for his work with Analogue, Inc. with the Analogue Nt mini, Super Nt, and the Mega Sg. 

In the 1990s Kevin Horton developed a game similar to Tetris titled "Kevtris", the name of which became an online handle.

Horton started working with Analogue in 2015 when he designed the Analogue Nt's HDMI daughterboard. In 2017, he was profiled in Vice Media's Motherboard as one of their Humans of the Year for his work with Analogue, Inc. on the Analogue Nt mini.

References

External links
 Kevtris' blog
 YouTube channel

Living people
People in the video game industry
American electrical engineers
Year of birth missing (living people)